Shavkat Bakhtibaevich Rakhmonov (born October 23, 1994) is a Kazakh professional mixed martial artist. He currently competes in the Welterweight division in the Ultimate Fighting Championship (UFC).
Rakhmonov is also a former M-1 Global Welterweight Champion.  As of March 7, 2023, he is #6 in the UFC welterweight rankings.

Background
Being born in Uzbekistan, Rakhmonov received citizenship of Kazakhstan in 2017. His grandfather's name was Rahman, so while living in a neighboring state, he had to take a surname with a local flavor. His father is a Kazakh of Altynbay tribe and his mother is a Kazakh of Konyrat tribe. Shavkat is from the Altynbai clan of Alimuly tribe of the Junior Zhuz.

Shavkat's sister, Sora Rakhmonova, is also a mixed martial artist.

Mixed martial arts career

Early career
As an amateur, Rakhmonov won the WMMAA World and Asian Championships titles.

Rakhmonov's professional career began in October 2014, debuting with a first round triangle choke victory against Adam Tsurov at M-1 Challenge 52. He would continue fighting mainly under the M-1 banner, with seven of his professional fights taking place in the promotion, with the remaining five wins coming in his home country's own MMA organization, Kazakhstan Mixed Martial Arts Federation (KZMMAF). He would alternate back-and-forth between the two organizations, earning his first shot at title as a pro against Faridun Odilov for the KZMMAF welterweight belt. He won the title by third-round TKO.

As an 18 years old, Rakhmonov became world champion, in amateur MMA, for WMMAA (World MMA Association) in 2013.

In 2014, he became WMMAA's Asian MMA champion. In the same year, he came as a runner-up in WMMAA's World Championship (2014) to Gadzhimurad Khiramagomedov. And finally in 2015, Rakhmonov again finished as a runner-up in WMMA World Championship, to Gadzhimurad Khiramagomedov. So, Gadzhimurad Khiramagomedov is the only person to defeat Rakhmonov in MMA fights, on two separate occasions.

Rakhmonov defended his belt in his next fight at Battle of Nomads 11 against Rinat Sayakbaev in December 2018, returning to M-1 at the start of the new year, facing Daniil Prikaza at M-1 Challenge 101 for the vacant M-1 Welterweight Championship. With a second-round TKO stoppage, the Kazakhstani secured his second belt.

In his last appearance on the regional scene, Rakhmonov defended his M-1 welterweight title with a first-round stoppage of Tiago Varejão at M-1 Challenge 102.

Ultimate Fighting Championship
Rakhmonov was the first Kazakh fighter to sign a contract with the UFC. Rakhmonov was scheduled to face Bartosz Fabiński on March 21, 2020, at UFC Fight Night: Woodley vs. Edwards. However, due to the COVID-19 pandemic the event was cancelled.

Rakhmonov was expected to face Ramazan Emeev on July 26, 2020, at UFC on ESPN: Whittaker vs. Till. However, in early July, it was reported that Rakhmonov was forced to pull out due to injury and was replaced by Niklas Stolze.

Rakhmonov was scheduled to fight Elizeu Zaleski dos Santos on October 24, 2020, at UFC 254. However, Zaleski pulled out due to injury and was replaced by Alex Oliveira. At the weigh-ins, Oliveira weighed in at 173 pounds, two pounds over the welterweight non-title fight limit. As a result, the bout proceeded as a catchweight and he was fined 20% of his purse, which went to Rakhmonov. Rakhmonov won the fight via guillotine choke submission in the first round.

Rakhmonov faced Michel Prazeres at UFC Fight Night: Gane vs. Volkov on June 26, 2021. He won the bout via rear-naked choke submission in the second round.

Rakhmonov faced Carlston Harris on February 5, 2022, at UFC Fight Night: Hermansson vs. Strickland. He won the fight via knockout in round one. This fight earned him the Performance of the Night award.

As the first bout of his new five-fight contract, Rakhmonov faced Neil Magny on June 25, 2022, at UFC on ESPN 38. He won the fight via a guillotine choke submission in the second round. This win earned him the Performance of the Night bonus award.

Rakhmonov was scheduled to face Geoff Neal on January 14, 2023, at UFC Fight Night: Gastelum vs. Imavov. However, Neal pulled out due to an undisclosed injury. The pair was rescheduled for UFC 285 on March 4, 2023. At the weigh-ins, Neal weighed in at 175 pounds, 4 pounds over the non-title fight welterweight limit. As a result, the bout proceeded as a catchweight and Neal was fined 30% of his fight purse, which went to Rakhmonov. He won the fight via a rear-naked choke submission in the third round. This fight earned Rakhmonov his first Fight of the Night award.

Championships and accomplishments

 World Mixed Martial Arts Association (WMMAA) 
  World Championship 
  Asian Championship 
  World Championship 
  World Championship 
Ultimate Fighting Championship
Performance of the Night (Two times) 
Fight of the Night 

M-1 Global
M-1 Welterweight Championship (One time) 
One successful title defense
Kazakhstan Mixed Martial Arts Federation
KZMMAF Welterweight Championship (One time)
One successful title defense

Mixed martial arts record

|-
|Win
|align=center|17–0
|Geoff Neal
|Submission (rear-naked choke)	
|UFC 285
|
|align=center|3
|align=center|4:17
|Las Vegas, Nevada, United States
|
|-
|Win
|align=center|16–0
|Neil Magny
|Submission (guillotine choke)
|UFC on ESPN: Tsarukyan vs. Gamrot
|
|align=center|2
|align=center|4:58
|Las Vegas, Nevada, United States
|
|-
|Win
|align=center|15–0
|Carlston Harris
|KO (spinning heel kick and punches)
|UFC Fight Night: Hermansson vs. Strickland
|
|align=center|1
|align=center|4:10
|Las Vegas, Nevada, United States
|
|-
|Win
|align=center|14–0
|Michel Prazeres
|Submission (rear-naked choke)
|UFC Fight Night: Gane vs. Volkov
|
|align=center|2
|align=center|2:10
|Las Vegas, Nevada, United States
|
|-
|Win
|align=center|13–0
|Alex Oliveira
|Submission (guillotine choke)
|UFC 254
|
|align=center|1
|align=center|4:40
|Abu Dhabi, United Arab Emirates
|
|-
|Win
|align=center|12–0
|Tiago Varejão
|TKO (punches)
|M-1 Challenge 102
|
|align=center|1
|align=center|4:50
|Nur-Sultan, Kazakhstan
|
|-
|Win
|align=center|11–0
|Daniil Prikaza
|TKO (punches)
|M-1 Challenge 101
|
|align=center|2
|align=center|2:20
|Almaty, Kazakhstan
|
|-
| Win
| align=center|10–0
| Rinat Sayakbaev
| TKO (retirement)
|KZMMAF: Battle of Nomads 11
|
| align=center|1
| align=center|5:00
|Taldıqorğan, Kazakhstan
|
|-
| Win
| align=center| 9–0
| Faridun Odilov
| TKO (punches)
| KZMMAF: Battle of Nomads 10
| 
| align=center| 3
| align=center| 3:03
| Astana, Kazakhstan
| 
|-
| Win
| align=center| 8–0
| Levan Solodovnik
| Submission (triangle choke)
| M-1 Challenge 87
| 
| align=center| 2
| align=center| 4:42
| Saint Petersburg, Russia
| 
|-
| Win
| align=center| 7–0
| Jun Yong Park
| Submission (rear-naked choke)
| KZMMAF: Battle of Nomads 9
| 
| align=center| 2
| align=center| 1:51
| Hwasun, South Korea
| 
|-
| Win
| align=center| 6–0
| Marcelo Brito
| KO (punch to the body)
| M-1 Challenge 67
| 
| align=center| 1
| align=center| 1:37
| Baku, Azerbaijan
|
|-
| Win
| align=center| 5–0
| Adil Boranbayev
| Submission (rear-naked choke)
| KZMMAF: Battle of Nomads 7
| 
| align=center|2
| align=center|4:51
| Astana, Kazakhstan
| 
|-
| Win
| align=center| 4–0
| Michał Wiencek
| Submission (guillotine choke)
|M-1 Challenge 59
|
| align=center|1
| align=center|0:49
|Astana, Kazakhstan
|
|-
| Win
| align=center| 3–0
| Bartosz Chyrek
|KO (punches)
|M-1 Challenge 57
|
| align=center|1
| align=center|2:51
|Orenburg, Russia
|
|-
| Win
| align=center| 2–0
| Marcus Vinicios
| TKO (punches)
|KZMMAF: Battle of Nomads 2
|
| align=center|1
| align=center|4:58
|Almaty, Kazakhstan
|
|-
| Win
| align=center| 1–0
| Adam Tsurov
| Submission (triangle choke)
|M-1 Challenge 52
|
|align=center|1
|align=center|N/A
|Nazran, Russia
|

See also 
 List of current UFC fighters
 List of male mixed martial artists
 List of undefeated mixed martial artists

References

External links 
  
 

1994 births
Living people
Kazakhstani male mixed martial artists
Welterweight mixed martial artists
Mixed martial artists utilizing sambo
Ultimate Fighting Championship male fighters
Kazakhstani sambo practitioners